Tijtin (Aymara tijti wart, -n a suffix) is a  mountain in the Bolivian Andes. It is situated in the Potosí Department, Nor Lípez Province, Colcha "K" Municipality. Tijtin lies south of the Uyuni salt flat, north-west of the mountains Qaral and Lliphi.

References 

Mountains of Potosí Department